Frank Lasky (born October 4, 1941) is a former American football tackle. He played for the New York Giants from 1964 to 1965.

References

1941 births
Living people
American football tackles
Florida Gators football players
New York Giants players
Montreal Alouettes players
Players of American football from New York (state)